is a private women's college in Asaminami, Hiroshima, Japan. The predecessor of the school, Hiroshima Joggakai , was founded in 1886, and it was chartered as a university in 1949. The original school, when it was established in 1886, was the first school for women in the city of Hiroshima. The school's first building, built in 1892, was one of the earliest Western buildings in the Hiroshima region.

The university is affiliated with Hiroshima Jogakuin Junior and Senior High Schools.

External links
 Official website

References 

Educational institutions established in 1886
Christian universities and colleges in Japan
Private universities and colleges in Japan
Universities and colleges in Hiroshima Prefecture
Association of Christian Universities and Colleges in Asia
Women's universities and colleges in Japan
1886 establishments in Japan